John Baptist Sequeira (23  June 1930 – 9 October 2019) was an Indian Roman Catholic bishop.

Sequeira was born in India and was ordained to the priesthood in 1958. He served as bishop of the Roman Catholic Diocese of Chikmagalur, India, from 1987 to 2006. In 1998 he won the Sahitya Akademi Award for his Konkani-language poetry "Ashim Asim Lharan".

Notes

1930 births
2019 deaths
20th-century Roman Catholic bishops in India
Konkani-language poets
21st-century Roman Catholic bishops in India
Recipients of the Sahitya Akademi Award in Konkani